Cut Your Teeth is the second studio album of singer-songwriter Kyla La Grange after her debut Ashes. It was released on June 2, 2014 and was preceded by an eponymous single "Cut Your Teeth" and a second single "The Knife".

The album explores minimalistic electronica music produced by electronic producer Jakwob.

Track listing

Singles from the album
The title track from the album was a pre-release of the album itself and has already charted in Denmark, Netherlands, Sweden and Switzerland

Charts

References

2014 albums
Kyla La Grange albums